Valerie Murtagh (born Patricia Valerie Jenkins, 1936, Willesden, London, England, also known under the pseudonym Valerie Avon) is an English singer and songwriter, who was a member of The Avons.

Career
After singing with the Avons vocal trio in the 1950s and 60s, alongside her husband's sister Elaine Murtagh and Elaine's husband Ray Adams, Murtagh became a songwriter under the name Valerie Avon.   Together with Adams and Elaine Murtagh, she wrote "Dance On!". This was a UK number one hit in 1963, and the year later returned to the UK Singles Chart in a vocal version by Kathy Kirby with lyrics by Marcel Stellman.

With her songwriting partner, Harold Spiro, she later wrote "Long Live Love", which was performed by Olivia Newton-John, the UK entry to the Eurovision Song Contest 1974.

She also co-wrote the following songs:
"In Summer" (Billy Fury) – Ray Adams, Valerie Avon and Elaine Murtagh
"Don't Move Away" (Cliff Richard) – Valerie Avon, Harold Spiro
"Annabella Umbrella" (Cliff Richard) – Valerie Avon, Neilburg, Harold Spiro
"Easy Lovin', Easy Livin'" (Georgie Fame) – Valerie Avon, Harold Spiro
"Easy Loving" (The Troggs) – Valerie Avon, Harold Spiro
"Desdemona" (The Searchers) – Valerie Avon, Harold Spiro -- U.S. #94
"I'm Gonna Find Myself A Girl" (Gene Pitney) – Ray Adams, Valerie Avon and Elaine Adams (Elaine Murtagh)

See also
United Kingdom in the Eurovision Song Contest

References

External links
Songwriting database

1936 births
Living people
English women singers
English songwriters
People from Willesden
Singers from London